The 2009 Big West Conference men's basketball tournament took place in March 2009.

Format
The top two seeds receive byes into the semifinals. Seeds 3 and 4 receive byes into the quarterfinals. If necessary, the bracket will be adjusted after each round so that the top and bottom seeds in each round play in the same game. The ninth place team, Cal Poly, did not receive a tournament invitation.

Bracket

References

2008–09 Big West Conference men's basketball season
Tournament
Big West Conference men's basketball tournament
Big West Conference men's basketball tournament